M. montana may refer to:

Macaduma montana, a moth of the family Erebidae
Macrophya montana, a sawfly species
Macrozamia montana, a plant in the family Zamiaceae
Madhuca montana, a tree of the family Sapotaceae
Magnolia montana, a plant species native to the Western Malesia region of the Indomalayan realm
Megophrys montana, a horned frog
Mentzelia montana, variegated bract blazingstar, a plant of the family Loasaceae
Mesothen montana, a moth of the family Erebidae
Miomantis montana, a praying mantis
Mordellistena montana, a beetle of the family Mordellidae
Mpanjaka montana, a moth of the family Erebidae
Muhlenbergia montana, mountain muhly, a species of grass

See also
 Montana (disambiguation)